Shavahn Nikole Church (born May 3, 1989 in Van Nuys, Los Angeles, California) is an American-British artistic gymnast who lives and trained in California. She formerly competed for the United States but decided in 2005 to represent Great Britain.

Early life

Church was born and raised in the California to British parents Raymond and Mandy Church. She has two sisters, Carley and Jade, who were also born in the United Kingdom. Her grandparents live in England.

She began training gymnastics at age 7.

Career

Church was a member of the U.S. Junior National Team in 2003. In 2004, she competed at the American Classic, finishing third on floor exercise and fifth all-around. Her placements qualified her for the U.S. championships in June 2004, where she broke her hand on her first event, the uneven bars.

Following an October 2004 ACL tear and faced with the likelihood of not making the U.S. Worlds team for 2005, Church decided to switch to competing for Great Britain while continuing to live and train in the U.S. She made her major international debut at the 2005 World Championships in Melbourne. Not fully recovered from an injury and severely out of competition practice, she placed 20th in the all-around.

Church was a member of the English team for the 2006 Commonwealth Games in Melbourne. Due to an injury to captain and world bronze medallist Beth Tweddle, the team had to compete with only four members, and were unable to challenge Australia for the gold medal. Instead, in the last rotation, they were in a dogfight with Canada for the silver. Church's bars routine secured second place for the team. In the all-around, Church was in medal contention until her beam routine, where a narrow save after a large wobble was not enough to prevent her from dropping behind, and she finished fifth. In apparatus finals, she bounced back, finishing second on bars to Elyse Hopfner-Hibbs of Canada.

Church was also a member of the British team for the 2006 European Championships in Greece. She had hopes of more success on bars (her highest Commonwealth Games score would have qualified her to the European finals), but injury struck in the qualifying rounds and she was unable to complete the competition. Later in 2006, she underwent surgery, and the recovery kept her out of further competition that year.

As a member of the University of California, Los Angeles women's gymnastics team, Church's competition debut was delayed after arthroscopic surgery on her right knee. In 2008, her only year of competition, she scored a season-best (9.875) at the NCAA Women's Gymnastics Championships, which was her final gymnastics meet. She was named a UCLA letterwinner for the year.

In July 2008, Church announced her retirement from gymnastics and began a coaching career in California.

Eponymous skill
Church has an eponymous uneven bars release move listed in the Code of Points.

Competitive History

References

External links
 
 

1989 births
Living people
American female artistic gymnasts
British female artistic gymnasts
English female artistic gymnasts
Commonwealth Games silver medallists for England
Commonwealth Games medallists in gymnastics
Gymnasts at the 2006 Commonwealth Games
U.S. women's national team gymnasts
People from Tarzana, Los Angeles
21st-century American women
Medallists at the 2006 Commonwealth Games